(other names include Ider Luvsandanzangiin and Ider Luvsandanzangyn)

Mrs. Luvsandanzan Ider was born in March 1937 and served Mongolia as a diplomat from 1963 until 1992. She was a first woman in her country to be endowed with the rank of Ambassador Extraordinary and Plenipotentiary. 

 
Success include 

EDUCATION:

 1963-Diploma, Institute of International Relations, Moscow, former USSR,
 1982- Diploma, Diplomatic Academy, Moscow, former USSR.
 1965- English Language Course, Leeds University, London, Britain.

PROFESSIONAL EXPERIENCE:

 1963-1972- Desk Officer, Department of International Organizations, Ministry
 of Foreign Affairs of Mongolia.
 1973-1976- Second Secretary, Embassy of Mongolia in London, Britain.
 1977-1979 and 1981-1986- Director, Department of International Organizations, Ministry of Foreign Affairs of Mongolia.
 1986-1989 — Chargé d'affaires of Mongolia in France and Permanent Delegate of Mongolia to UNESCO.
 1989-1992- Director, Department of Treaty and Legal Affairs, Ministry of Foreign Affairs of Mongolia.
 1993-up to August 2006 – Adviser for Foreign Affairs, Supreme Court of Mongolia.

PARTICIPATION AND POSTS IN INTERNATIONAL ORGANISATIONS:

 1962-1985 - UN General Assembly sessions (as an expert, adviser, member of delegation);
 1972- Rapporteur (a rapporteur is a person who is officially appointed by an organisation to investigate a problem or attend a meeting and to report on it) Third Committee, UN General Assembly for Elimination of All Forms of Racial Discrimination;
 1977- Vice-chairperson, Third Committee, UN General Assembly;
 1977—Chairperson, Working Group, Third Committee, UN General Assembly on drafting a Convention on the Elimination of All Forms of Discrimination Against Women;
 1977—1986— Representative of Mongolia, UN Commission for Social Development;
 1979- Vice-chairperson, UN Commission for Social Development;
 1985- chairperson, UN Commission for Social Development;
 1982-1984- First Chairperson for the UN Committee on the Elimination of Discrimination Against Women.
 1984-1986- Member of the UN Committee on the Elimination of Discrimination Against Women;
 1991-1994 - Member the UN Committee on Economic, Social and Cultural Rights. Twice served as a member of the sessional working group;

DOMESTICALLY IN MONGOLIA

 1991- Member, Working Group of Experts on drafting the New Constitution of Mongolia. (Particularly parts of the Constitution related Fundamental Human Rights and Judicial Power)
 1993-2005 – Established and developed foreign relations of Supreme Court of Mongolia. 
 1992 — Initiated a comprehensive project on promotion and implementation of human rights in Mongolia, which was successfully implemented by the United Nations Human Rights Centre under UN Technical Assistance Program.
 1993 - Translated in cooperation with two other translators the text of the old Code of Criminal Procedure of Mongolia from Mongolian into English (for analysis by UN experts on Human Rights)
 2005 — Checked and edited the translation from English into Mongolian of the Manual on Human Rights for Judges, Prosecutors and Lawyers. (Office of the High Commissioner for Human Rights in cooperation with the International Bar Association)
 2006- Translated from English into Mongolian 8 Modules on combating money laundry prepared by World Bank.

AWARDS

Received several awards including Ryoko Akamatsu Award of the Japanese Association of International Women's Rights for the significant contribution to the elaboration of the Convention on the Elimination of All Forms of Discrimination against Women (Tokyo); and from the Government of Mongolia including award for the contribution to drafting of the present Constitution of Mongolia (award was given on the occasion of the Anniversary of the adoption of the Constitution); and the most recent one 

First women to have the rank of Ambassador Extraordinary and Plenipotentiary

Foreign Languages - English, Russian, French, Hindi (the last two – read and understand)

References
Committee on the Elimination of Discrimination against Women (un.org)

Microsoft Word - Chairpersons of CEDAW 1982-2008.doc (un.org)

The Concept of Race in International Criminal Law - Carola Lingaas - Google Books

2085th Plenary Meeting of General Assembly: 27th Session | United Nations UN Audiovisual Library (unmultimedia.org)

2104th, 2107th Plenary Meetings of General Assembly: 27th Session | United Nations UN Audiovisual Library (unmultimedia.org)

Index to Proceedings of the Economic and Social Council, 1992

1937 births
Living people
Ambassadors of Mongolia
Mongolian women diplomats
Women ambassadors